Osvaldo Antonio Ferreño (born 8 February 1941) is an Argentine former footballer.

References

1941 births
Living people
Association football forwards
Argentine footballers
Boca Juniors footballers
Pan American Games medalists in football
Pan American Games silver medalists for Argentina
Footballers at the 1963 Pan American Games
Medalists at the 1963 Pan American Games